Herbert Paul Sapsford (8 September 1949 – 29 December 2009) was a New Zealand rugby union player. A prop, Sapsford represented Otago at a provincial level, and was a member of the New Zealand national side, the All Blacks, on the 1976 tour of South America. He played seven matches on that tour, including the two unofficial internationals against Argentina.

Sapsford died from injuries sustained in a jetboat accident near the confluence of the Dobson and Hopkins Rivers at the head of Lake Ohau. He was buried in Allanton Cemetery.

References

1949 births
2009 deaths
Rugby union players from Invercargill
People educated at James Hargest College
University of Otago alumni
New Zealand dentists
New Zealand rugby union players
New Zealand international rugby union players
Otago rugby union players
Rugby union props
New Zealand expatriate rugby union players
Expatriate rugby union players in England
New Zealand expatriate sportspeople in England
Accidental deaths in New Zealand
Boating accident deaths
Burials at Allanton Cemetery
20th-century dentists